First cat may refer to:

 Certain cats associated with national governments:
 United States presidential pets, which have included cats
 Chief Mouser to the Cabinet Office in the United Kingdom
 Think Think and Ah Tsai, two cats owned by Taiwanese president Tsai Ing-wen
 The domestication of the cat